Return from Witch Mountain is a 1978 American science fiction–adventure film and a sequel to Escape to Witch Mountain (1975) and the second film in the Witch Mountain franchise. It was produced by Walt Disney Productions. It was written by Malcolm Marmorstein and is based on characters created by Alexander Key, who also wrote the novelization of the film for Disney. Ike Eisenmann, Kim Richards, and Denver Pyle reprise their roles as Tony, Tia, and Uncle Bené—humanoid extraterrestrials with special powers including telepathy and telekinesis. The two main villains are played by Bette Davis as Letha Wedge, a greedy woman using the last of her money to finance the scientific experiments of Dr. Victor Gannon, played by Christopher Lee. It was the final film of actor Jack Soo, who died of cancer in January 1979.

In September 1978, the film was re-released to theaters on a double bill with Escape to Witch Mountain.

A television film called Beyond Witch Mountain was made in 1982.

Plot 
Tony and his sister Tia are in need of a vacation. Uncle Bené drops them off in their flying saucer at the Rose Bowl Stadium in Los Angeles, California, after which the siblings quickly become separated from each other. A man named Dr. Victor Gannon and his assistant Letha Wedge witness Tony using his powers to save Letha's nephew Sickle from certain death. Realizing that Tony has supernatural powers, Dr. Gannon drugs the boy with a tranquilizer shot and takes him back to their laboratory. There, Dr. Gannon successfully tests a new mind-control technology on him. Under its influence, Tony is completely hypnotized and does everything his kidnappers want him to do, including stealing gold from a museum exhibit and stopping Tia from finding them. With Tony at his robotic bidding, Dr. Gannon hopes to achieve recognition within the scientific community and worldwide power, while Letha merely wants a return on her investment.

The Earthquake Gang, a group of would-be tough boys Tia meets, are being chased by a group of rivals; Tia telepathically gets rid of them. The boys accept her into their ranks  and help her look for her brother. They let her sleep in their secret hideout, where she has visions of Tony's location.  Tia sees Tony at work in a goal museum; he is controlled by a chip attached to his ear. He unstacks the gold but is followed by Mr. Yokomoto, the truant officer who thinks Tony should go to school, and chases the doctor, aunt, nephew, and Tony in his minibus unsuccessfully. In the chase, Mr. Yokomoto destroys public property and loses his job.

Using her telepathy to find Tony, Tia discovers his captors' hideout but is caught by Sickle and placed in an anaesthesia chamber by Gannon. Unable to move, Tia telepathically asks a goat to find the Earthquake Gang. The gang chases the goat back to the hideout and free Tia as Tony, Letha, Sickle, and Victor drive to a plant to steal plutonium. Tia traces their location and describes it as a "big round ball." They come across Mr. Yokomoto, who tells them  he lost his job and the only thing that works is the radio. The news given about the plutonium plant stresses on the word "molecular flow."

Tia then asks Mr. Yokomoto to drive them to the location after she magically repairs the minibus. After Victor and his gang reach the site, he shuts down the plant's cooling system. In exchange for turning it on, he demands 5 million dollars in cash. The people working at the plant make arrangements for the money as soon as possible, but Tia reaches the site in time, where she and Tony battle to turn on the cooling system. Tia manages to turn it on, but Victor commands Tony to kill his sister. Tia realizes he is being controlled and destroys the device. Tony makes Victor, Sickle and Letha go up to the ceiling with no way of getting down. Mr. Yokomoto drives the kids to the Rose Bowl Stadium and the Earthquake Gang come along to say goodbye. Tony and Tia bid farewell to the kids after they board the flying saucer and go back to Witch Mountain.

Cast 

 Bette Davis as Letha Wedge
 Christopher Lee as Dr. Victor Gannon
 Kim Richards as Tia Malone
 Ike Eisenmann as Tony Malone
 Jack Soo as Mr. "Yo-Yo" Yokomoto
 Anthony James as Sickle
 Richard Bakalyan as Eddie
 Ward Costello as Mr. Clearcole
 Christian Juttner as Dazzler
 Brad Savage as Muscles
 Poindexter Yothers as Crusher
 Jeffrey Jacquet as Rocky
 Stu Gilliam as Dolan
 William Bassett as Operations officer
 Tom Scott as Monitor
 Helene Winston as Dowager
 Albert Able as Engineer
 Denver Pyle as Uncle Bené
 Brian Part and Pierre Daniel as Goons
 Wally Brooks as Taxi fare
 Mel Gold as Security guard
 Bob Yothers as Cop
 Casse Jaeger as School patrolman
 Larry Mamorstein as Guard
 Bob James as Gate guard
 Ruth Warshawsky as Lady in car
 Adam Anderson as Man in museum
 Rosemary Lord as Woman in museum
 Ted Noose as Policeman
 Wally Berns as Man in car

Actors Kim Richards and Ike Eisenmann appear in at least four films together—this one, the original 1975 Disney film Escape to Witch Mountain, and the television film Devil Dog: The Hound of Hell. Richards portrays the roadside waitress and Eisenmann portrays the Sheriff in a re-imagined remake of the original film Race to Witch Mountain, released in March 2009.

Jack Soo (Mr. "Yo-Yo" Yokomoto) was diagnosed with esophageal cancer in the autumn of 1978, several months after the film's release. Return from Witch Mountain would be his final movie appearance, as he died the following January.

The emergency voice heard over Yokomoto's minibus radio—announcing the problem at the plutonium plant—is that of Gary Owens.

Filming locations 
Filming started on April 11, 1977.

The otherwise vacant lot, upon which the children's dilapidated mansion hideout stands, was at the Alameda Street railroad yard in California, where the Rochester House (a relic from the 1880s) was waiting for restoration and relocation. The house was never restored and was ultimately demolished in 1979.

Scenes of Dr. Victor Gannon's mansion, the location of his laboratory, were filmed at Moby Castle on Durand Drive, Hollywood Hills, Los Angeles.

The tunnel scenes were filmed at the Fillmore and Western Railway in Fillmore, California constructing a faux tunnel structure. The faux tunnel still stands and can be seen from CA-126/Telegraph Road.

The gold bar robbery sequence was filmed at the Natural History Museum in Exposition Park, Los Angeles. The building facing the park's Rose Garden was used for exterior shots of the museum. The scene in which Yokomoto's minibus is overturned and breaks a fire hydrant was filmed near the Sunset Boulevard bridge and Glendale Boulevard underpass intersection, in the Echo Park district.

Novelization 
Alexander Key wrote a novelization of Return from Witch Mountain, based on Malcolm Marmorstein's screenplay; the book was released by Westminster Press in 1978 to coincide with the film's theatrical release.

Home video 
Return from Witch Mountain was released on VHS in April 1986. It was first released as a Special Edition DVD in Region 1 on September 2, 2003, re-released on DVD in a two-movie collection along with Escape to Witch Mountain on September 5, 2006, and re-released as part of the Walt Disney Family Classics line on March 10, 2009.

Return from Witch Mountain was released on Blu-ray as a Disney Movie Club exclusive title in October 2015.

Notes

External links 
 
 
 
 

1978 films
1970s fantasy adventure films
1970s mystery films
1970s science fiction adventure films
American mystery films
Mad scientist films
Walt Disney Pictures films
American children's adventure films
American children's fantasy films
American fantasy adventure films
American science fiction adventure films
American sequel films
Films based on science fiction novels
Films directed by John Hough
Films produced by Ron W. Miller
Films scored by Lalo Schifrin
Films set in Los Angeles
Witch Mountain films
Films about telekinesis
Witch Mountain (franchise)
1970s English-language films
1970s American films